Bauck Poppema or Bauck Foppesd. of Popma and Bauck Hemmema, born in Terschelling, died in Berlikum, Friesland 1501, was a legendary Dutch heroine, known for her defence of the fort Hemmemastate during the conflict between the Schieringers party and the Vetkopers party in 1496.

Poppema was the wife of Doeke Hettes Hemmema (d. 1503), an ally of the Schieringers party. In 1496, a pregnant Poppema successfully defended the fort for a time during a siege by invaders from the city of Groningen. Eventually, however, enemy reinforcements arrived, after which the fort fell and all of Poppema's soldiers were executed. Poppema was imprisoned in Groningen, where legend holds that she gave birth to twins while chained in a dungeon. She was released in 1497.

Bauck Poppema has become a metaphor for a "brave woman" and an ideal for a Frisian heroine, and was compared to 
Jeanne Hachette and Kenau Simonsdochter Hasselaer.

References 

 http://www.inghist.nl/Onderzoek/Projecten/DVN/lemmata/data/Poppema

16th-century Dutch people
Women in 15th-century warfare
1501 deaths
Dutch nobility
People from Terschelling
Year of birth unknown
Women in medieval European warfare
Women in war in the Netherlands